Theon of Samos was an ancient Greek painter during the era of Alexander the Great, is mentioned by Quintilian as a good artist of the second rank. If we may trust the somewhat flimsy stories told about him, his forte consisted in a lifelike, or perhaps, as Brunn puts it, a theatrical representation of action. His figures were said to start out of the picture. He chose such congenial subjects as the madness of Orestes, and a soldier rushing to battle. Another painter, Theorus, is mentioned, whom Brunn regards as identical with Theon.

References

Ancient Greek painters
Ancient Samians
4th-century BC Greek people
4th-century BC painters